The 2014 Palmer Cup was held on 26–28 June 2014 at Walton Heath Golf Club near Walton-on-the-Hill in Surrey, England. Europe won 18½–11½.

Format
On Thursday, there were five matches of foursomes matches in the morning, followed by five four-balls in the afternoon. Ten singles matches were played on Friday, and ten more on Saturday.. In all, 24 matches were played.

Each of the 30 matches was worth one point in the larger team competition. If a match was all square after the 18th hole, each side earned half a point toward their team total. The team that accumulated at least 15½ points won the competition.

Teams
Ten college golfers from Europe and the United States participated in the event.

Thursday's matches

Morning foursomes

Afternoon four-ball

Friday's singles matches

Saturday's singles matches

Michael Carter award
The Michael Carter Award winners were Ricardo Gouveia and Rico Hoey.

References

External links
Palmer Cup official site

Arnold Palmer Cup
Golf tournaments in England
Palmer Cup
Palmer Cup
Palmer Cup